Wawrzyszów  is a village in the administrative district of Gmina Wolanów, within Radom County, Masovian Voivodeship, in east-central Poland.

The village has an approximate population of 300.

References

Villages in Radom County